Danutė is quite popular female given name in Lithuania. Women named Danutė include:

Elzbieta, sometimes also known as Danmila or Danutė (14th century), daughter of Gediminas, Grand Duke of Lithuania (see family of Gediminas)  
Danutė of Lithuania (15th century), daughter of Kęstutis, Grand Duke of Lithuania 
Danutė Budreikaitė (born 1953), Lithuanian politician and Member of the European Parliament
Danutė Jočienė (born 1970), Lithuanian lawyer and a representative of Lithuania in the European Court of Human Rights
Kazimira Danutė Prunskienė (born 1943), Lithuanian politician and former Prime Minister

See also
Danuta (disambiguation) – Polish equivalent

Lithuanian feminine given names